Brunswick is an unincorporated community in Brunswick Township, Kanabec County, Minnesota, United States.  The community is located between Mora and Rock Creek at the junction of State Highway 65 (MN 65) and State Highway 70 (MN 70).

The Groundhouse River flows through the community.  Nearby places include Mora, Braham, Coin, Stanchfield, and Grasston.

ZIP codes 55051 (Mora) and 55006 (Braham) meet near Brunswick.

History
Brunswick, platted in 1856, is located within Brunswick Township.  The community is located in Section 1 of the township, but its history begins with the Hersey, Staples and Bean Lumber Company who had their logging headquarters in Section 12 of the township.  George and Isaac Staples platted the community's site, naming it after Brunswick, Maine.  With stores, post office and mills located in Brunswick, it became the county seat for Kanabec County on March 13, 1859.  It remained as the county seat until the seat was transferred to Mora in 1883.

A post office was established at Brunswick in 1860, and remained in operation until 1934.

References

 Rand McNally Road Atlas – 2007 edition – Minnesota entry
 Official State of Minnesota Highway Map – 2013/2014 edition

Unincorporated communities in Minnesota
Unincorporated communities in Kanabec County, Minnesota